Delta-3-Tetrahydrocannabinol (Delta-3-THC, Δ3-THC, Δ6a(10a)-THC, EA-1477) is a synthetic isomer of tetrahydrocannabinol, developed during the original research in the 1940s to develop synthetic routes to the natural products Δ8-THC and Δ9-THC found in the cannabis plant. While the normal trans configuration of THC is in this case flattened by the double bond, it still has two enantiomers as the 9-methyl group can exist in an (R) or (S) conformation. The (S) enantiomer has similar effects to Δ9-THC though with several times lower potency, while the (R) enantiomer is many times less active or inactive, depending on the assay used.

See also
 7,8-Dihydrocannabinol
 Cannabitriol
 Delta-4-Tetrahydrocannabinol
 Delta-7-Tetrahydrocannabinol
 Delta-10-Tetrahydrocannabinol
 Hexahydrocannabinol
 JWH-138
 Parahexyl

References 

Benzochromenes
Cannabinoids
Heterocyclic compounds with 3 rings